Players in bold have now been capped at full International level.

Group A

Belarus 

Head coach:  Yuri Puntus

Croatia 

Head coach:  Martin Novoselac

Italy 

Head coach:  Claudio Gentile

Serbia and Montenegro

Head coach:  Vladimir Petrović

Group B

Germany

Head coach:  Uli Stielike

Portugal

Head coach:  José Romão

Sweden

Head Coach :  Torbjörn Nilsson

Switzerland

Head coach:  Bernard Challandes

Footnotes

Squads
UEFA European Under-21 Championship squads